Beautiful Cooking (Traditional Chinese: 美女廚房, literally: Beautiful Girl's Kitchen) is a Hong Kong variety show broadcast on TVB. The show began broadcasting on May 28, 2006 hosted by Ronald Cheng, Alex Fong and Edmond Leung. The second season began broadcast from April 5, 2009.

Format
The game participants include 3 female Hong Kong celebrities. Usually the girls are invited for their beauty or celebrity status. The girls are given an apron to wear on top of the clothes they come in.

Competition 1
For the first competition, a master chef will cook a more complicated dish and then explain the recipe and cooking procedure. The female celebrities are then requested to match the chef's dish by trying to imitate the cooking and recipe.

Competition 2
In competition 2, the three contestants are presented with a live seafood. Their tasks are to butcher, clean, and prepare the seafood all by themselves.

Points
When the dishes are finished, the hosts, guest judges and the guest chef gets to sample the dishes and on a scale of -10 to 10, they give out a score. Selected members of the audience also get a chance to try the dishes and make additional comments. Winners are announced at the end of the show.

Season 1

Beautiful girl cooking helpers
The show also consist of a few girls dressed in maid costumes. They are nicknamed according to Chinese food names, and are featured in all the episodes.

 Congee - Yetta Tse (謝珊珊)
 Fen - Helena Wong (黃卓慧)
 Noodle - Tse Siu Wan (謝兆韵)
 Rice - Snow Suen (孫慧雪)
 Tong sui - Chacha Chan (陳文靜)

Celebrities

Final Points

Season 2

Beautiful Cooking helper girls
The girls were changed this season.  They play a different food role type.

 Blueberry - Kibby Lau (劉俐)
 Mandarin oranges - Yuri Chan (陳蕊蕊)
 Banana - Vanko Wong (王淑玲)
 Rice noodle roll - Ting Lok-sze (丁樂鍶)
 Spring roll - Lukian Wang (王宝宝)
 Red bean paste baozi - Cienna Leung (梁懿晴)

Celebrities

Final episode
The final episode featured the Beautiful Cooking cast versus the Super Trio Series cast.  It was filmed at the Shenzhen Overseas Chinese Town, a major amusement-park-city with water and other resort facilities.

Final Points

See also
 List of TVB Series (2006)
 List of TVB Series (2009)

References

External links
 Beautiful cooking TVB

TVB original programming
Cooking television series
2006 Hong Kong television series debuts
2007 Hong Kong television series endings